Adrien Faizelot-Delorme (master in 1748 – after 1783) was a well-known cabinetmaker (ébéniste) working in Paris, the most prominent in a family of ébénistes

Becoming master 22 June 1748, he set up in the rue du Temple, a centrally-located site where fashionable clients could find him, for he worked as a dealer in furniture as well as running his own workshop; as dealer, his stamp is often found on pieces made by other ébénistes. His own furniture featured fine marquetry and lacquered furniture.

In 1783 Delorme sold his remaining stock at public auction and retired from business.

Notes

French furniture makers
Furniture designers from Paris
Year of death missing
1748 births